Rewa Kantha was a political agency of British India, managing the relations (indirect rule) of the British government's Bombay Presidency with a collection of princely states. It stretched for about 150 miles between the plain of Gujarat and the hills of Malwa, from the Tapti River to the Mahi River crossing the Rewa (or Narmada) River, from which it takes its name.

The political agent, who was also District collector of the prant (British District) of the Panchmahal, resided at Godhra.

History 
The native states came under British subsidiary alliances after the Third Anglo-Maratha War of the early 19th century.

The total surface was 4,971.75 square miles, comprising 3,412 villages, with a population of 479,055, yielding 2,072,026 Rupeese state revenue and paying 147,826 Rupees tribute (mostly to the Gaikwar Baroda State).

In 1937 the princely states of the Rewa Kantha Agency were merged with Baroda State in order to form the Baroda and Gujarat States Agency, which in turn merged in 1944 with the Western India States Agency as Baroda, Western India and Gujarat States Agency.

After the Independence of British India in 1947, split into India and Pakistan, the rulers of the states all agreed to accede to the Government of India and were integrated into Bombay State. Bombay state was split along linguistic lines in 1960, and Rewa Kantha became part of Gujarat, like Saurashtra State.

Princely States 
The number of separate states was 61, mostly minor or petty states except for five. Many of them were under British influence; the largest one was Rajpipla.

The Agency also dealt with five first-class states named Chhota Udaipur State, Devgadh Bariya State, Santrampur, Lunawada State and Balasinor State. In 1901 their population was 479,065. Many of the inhabitants were Bhils and Kolis.

Rewa Kantha division 
(includes all the main states; in direct relations with the Political Agent at Godhra)

Salute states :
 Rajpipla (Nandod), First Class, title Maharaja, Hereditary salute of 13-guns
 Bari(y)a (Devgadh), Second Class, title Maharaol, Hereditary salute of 9-guns (11-guns personal)
 Lunavada, Second Class, title Maharana, Hereditary salute of 9-guns
 Balasinor, Second Class, title Nawab, Hereditary salute of 9-guns
 Sant (Sunth) (Rampur), Second Class, title Maharana, Hereditary salute of 9-guns

 Chhota Udepur, First Class, title Maharaja Maharawal, Hereditary Salute of 11 - guns

Non-salute states : 
 Kadana, Third Class
 Sanjeli, Third Class
 Jambughoda (Narukot), Third Class

Mehwas 
Only non-salute states: two geographical groups of minor or petty rural (e)states

Sankheda 
(near Narmada River)

 Mandwa, Third Class (personal) / Fourth Class
Gad Boriad, Third Class (personal) / Fourth Class
 Shanor, Fourth Class
Vajiria, Fourth Class
Vanmala, Fourth Class (personal) / Fifth Class
 Nangam, Fifth Class
 Naswadi, Gujarat, 
 Uchad, 
 Agar, 
Palasni,
  Khareda  ,
  Borkhad  ,
 Bhilodia :
Motisinghji,
Chhatarsinghji,
 Vasan Virpur, 
 Vo(h)ra, 
 Vasan Sewada, 
 Alwa, 
 Chorangla, 
 Sindiapura, 
 Bihora, 
 Vadia (Virampura), 
 Dudhpur, 
 Rampura, 
 Jiral Kamsoli, 
 Chudesar, 
 Pantalavdi : 
 Akbar Khan, 
 Kesar Khan, 
 Regan, 
 Nalia,

Pandu 
(near Mahi River; all paying tribute to the Gaekwar Baroda State):

 Bhadarwa, Third Class
 Umetha, Third (personal) / Fourth Class
 Sihora, Fourth Class
 Pandu, Fifth Class
 Chhaliar, 
 Mevli, 
 Kanoda , 
 Poicha, 
 Dhari, 
 Itwad, 
 Gotardi, 
 Litter Gothda, 
 Amrapur, 
 Vakhtapur, 
 Jesar, 
 Moka Pagi nu Muvadu, 
 Kalsa Pagi nu Muvadu, 
 Rajpur, 
 Moti Varnol, 
 Jumkha, 
 Nani Varnol, 
 Varnolmal,
 Angadh,

 the Dorka (e)states
 Dorka, 
 Angadh, 
 Rayka (Raika),

Fiscal Stamps 
In addition to those of Rewa Kantha Agency itself, revenue and/or court fee stamps were issued for the following native states :
 in the Rewa Kantha Division (all) 
 Rajpipla
 Balasinor
 Baria
 Lunavada
 Sant
 Chhota Udaipur
 Jambughoda
 Kadana
 Sanjeli

 in the Sankheda Mehwas (only these) 
 Gad Boriad
 Naswadi
 Shanor
 Vajiria

 in the Pandu Mehwas (only these)  
 Bhadarva
 Pandu Mewas
 Umeta
 Bakrol (Boru)

See also 
 Bombay Presidency
 List of Koli states and clans

References

Sources and external links 
 Imperial Gazetteer, on DSAL - Rewa Kantha Agency

History of Gujarat
Bombay Presidency
Agencies of British India
Panchmahal district